NGTS-14Ab  or 2MASS J21540423-3822388 is a Neptune-sized (Sub-Jovian) exoplanet that was discovered by NGTS (Next-Generation Transit Survey) and is located in the NGTS-14 planetary system. The discovery was announced in January 2021. The Orbital period of NGTS-14Ab is around 3.54 days. The age of NGTS-14Ab is approximately 5.9 billion years old. The exoplanet is around 0.44 Jovian radii.

References 

Exoplanets discovered in 2021
Giant planets